Zakya Daoud (real name Jacqueline Loghlam) is a French journalist. She was born in 1937 in Bernay in France. She was naturalized Moroccan and changed her name in 1959.

Loghlam started her career as a journalist in 1958 for the Moroccan radio and then as a correspondent in Morocco for the weekly Jeune Afrique, which asked her to sign her articles with the pseudonym "Zakya Daoud", a borrowed name under which she continued writing.

In 1966, she became chief editor of Lamalif, a Moroccan magazine until it was stopped from publishing by the Moroccan  authorities in 1988. From 1989 to 2001, Daoud contributed articles to several French journals including Maghreb-Machrek, Arabies and Le Monde diplomatique. Since that time, she has published several books in the fields of sociology and history.

References

Bibliography
 L’État du Maghreb (collected works), la Découverte, 1990.
 Féminisme et politique au Maghreb, Éditions Maisonneuve et Larose, 1994
 Ferhart Abbas, une utopie algérienne (in collaboration with Benjamin Stora), Éditions Denoël, 1995
 Ben Barka (in collaboration with Maati Monjib), Éditions Michalon, 1996
 Marocains des deux rives, Éditions L’Atelier, 1997.
 Abdelkrim, une épopée d’or et de sang, Éditions Séguier, 1999 
 Gibraltar, croisée de mondes et Gibraltar, improbable frontière, Éditions Atlantica-Séguier, 2002
 De l’immigration à la citoyenneté, Éditions Mémoire de la Méditerranée, 2003
 Zaynab, reine de Marrakech (novel), Éditions L’Aube, 2004
 Marocains de l’autre rive, Éditions Paris Méditerranée-Tarik, 2004
 Casablanca en mouvement, Éditions Autrement, 2005
 Les Années Lamalif : 1958-1988, trente ans de journalisme, Éditions Tarik et Senso Unico, 2007

External links
Bibliomonde Zakya Daoud bibliography on Biblimonde website. Retrieved 23 April 2008.
Loubna Bernichi, "Zakya Daoud, la pasionaria de la plume", Maroc Hebdo. Archived from the original on 13 October 2008. Retrieved 30 March 2018.

Moroccan writers
Moroccan women writers
Moroccan journalists
Moroccan women journalists
Moroccan non-fiction writers
1937 births
Moroccan radio journalists
Moroccan women radio journalists
Living people
Naturalized citizens of Morocco
Moroccan people of French descent
People from Bernay, Eure